The Blohm & Voss Ha 139 was a German all-metal inverted gull wing floatplane. With its four engines it was at the time one of the largest float-equipped seaplanes that had been built. The inboard engines were mounted at the joint between the inboard anhedral and outboard dihedral wing sections, above the pylon-mounted floats.

Further development of the Ha 139 led to the land-based version Blohm & Voss BV 142 which had its first flight in October 1938.

Operational history

The aircraft were flown by Deutsche Luft Hansa on transatlantic routes between 1937 and 1939, predominantly between Bathurst, The Gambia and Natal, Brazil.

On the outbreak of World War II, the planes were transferred to the Luftwaffe and used for transport, reconnaissance and minesweeping work over the Baltic Sea. They were not particularly suited for military use.

Variants
Data from: Aircraft of the Third Reich

Projekt 15
Catapult launched floatplane  mail-carrier design for Deutsche Lufthansa (DLH), became the Ha 139.

Projekt 20
A reconnaissance-bomber derivative of Projekt 15 submitted to the Reichsluftfahrtministerium (RLM) (German air Ministry) but generating little interest.

Ha 139 V1
Named Nordwind — First of two baseline prototypes

Ha 139 V2
Named Nordmeer — Second of two baseline prototypes

Ha 139 V3
Named Nordstern — Third prototype with longer wingspan, increased wing area and modified engine mounts.

Ha 139B
The Ha 139 V3 re-designated when in service with DLH.

Ha 139B/Umbau
After service with DLH, the Ha 139B was modified as the Ha 139B/Umbau with an extended glazed nose accommodating a navigator and a spherical Ikaria mount for a machine-gun. Further machine guns were mounted in the cockpit roof hatch and in lateral mountings on either side of the rear fuselage.

Ha 139B/MS
The Ha 139B/Umbau was later modified into a minesweeping (Minensuch) aircraft fitted with a large magnetic sensing loop strung between the nose, floats, wing-tips, and tail unit.

Specifications (Ha 139B/Umbau)

See also

References
Notes

Bibliography

 Green, William. Warplanes of the Third Reich. London: Macdonald and Jane's Publishers Ltd., 4th impression 1979, p. 78–80. .
 Smith J.Richard and Kay, Anthony. German Aircraft of the Second World War. London: Putnam & Company Ltd., 3rd impression 1978, p. 63–66. .
 Wood, Tony and Gunston, Bill. Hitler's Luftwaffe: A pictorial history and technical encyclopedia of Hitler's air power in World War II. London: Salamander Books Ltd., 1977, p. 133. .

External links

 "Sixteen Ton Plane to Link U.S. and Germany" Popular Mechanics, May 1937

Ha 139
1930s German mailplanes
1930s German military reconnaissance aircraft
Inverted gull-wing aircraft
Floatplanes
Diesel-engined aircraft
Four-engined tractor aircraft
Low-wing aircraft
Aircraft first flown in 1936
Four-engined piston aircraft